The Fort Peck Dam is the highest of six major dams along the Missouri River, located in northeast Montana in the United States, near Glasgow, and adjacent to the community of Fort Peck. It lies within the Charles M. Russell National Wildlife Refuge. The dam and the  lake are owned and operated by the U.S. Army Corps of Engineers and exist for the purposes of hydroelectric power generation, flood control, and water quality management.

The dam presently has a nameplate capacity of 185.25 megawatts, divided among 5 generating units (which in turn are divided between the Western and Eastern grids). Three units in powerhouse number one, completed in 1951, have a capacity of 105 MW. Completed in 1961, the two remaining generating units in powerhouse number 2, have a nameplate capacity of 80 MW.

The lake level fluctuates over time based on a number of factors. In June 2011, in response to the 2011 Missouri River Floods, the dam was releasing almost , which greatly exceeded its previous record release of  set in 1975.

Background
Fort Peck was a major project of the Public Works Administration, part of the New Deal. Construction of Fort Peck Dam started in 1933, and at its peak in July 1936 employed 10,546 workers. The dam, named for a 19th-century trading post, was completed in 1940, and began generating electricity in July 1943. The town of Fort Peck, Montana, "the government town," was built for Army Corps of Engineers personnel and men in "positions of responsibility" and their families during the dam's construction. Many of the facilities that supported the dam's workers are still used today, such as the recreation center and the Fort Peck Theater. In addition to Fort Peck, other towns sprang up to house the workers. Among these were Wheeler and McCone City as well as more than a dozen others. Many of the homes were later moved to farms and towns around Montana.

Fort Peck Dam is one of six Missouri River Main stem dams operated by the U.S. Army Corps of Engineers, Omaha District. The dams downstream of Fort Peck Dam are: Garrison Dam (near Riverdale, North Dakota), Oahe Dam (near Pierre, South Dakota), Big Bend Dam (near Fort Thompson, South Dakota), Fort Randall Dam (near Pickstown, South Dakota), and Gavins Point Dam (near Yankton, South Dakota).

Construction
The site chosen was on a stretch of the Missouri River flowing from south to north. Beneath these deposits lay a thick (approximately ) deposit of Bear Paw shale. This shale is classified as a firm shale and contains thin (< layers of bentonite. The remaining deposits consisted of the alluvial materials mentioned above. These deposits had many interconnecting layers of coarse sands and gravels, necessitating the installation of a steel sheet pile wall down to the firm shale, from the left to the right abutment.

The upstream face was designed with an average slope of one vertical on four horizontal and included three horizontal shelves built into the slope. A flatter (1 on 7.5) berm was to be placed between stations 30+00 and 75+00 (approximately the center half of the length of the dam).

Since the construction method of hydraulic fill was chosen, four electric dredges were built. Because of the distance of the site from the nearest shoreline, a shipyard was started on the site, affectionately dubbed "The Fort Peck Navy" and "The Biggest Shipyard in Montana" by the workers. These dredges would pump material from nearby borrow pits to the dam site where it was discharged by pipes along the outside edges of the fill. The coarser material settled out quickly, while the fines were carried downhill toward what would eventually become the core of the dam. Samples were taken from all zones regularly to ensure that the material had the gradation and consolidation characteristics specified by the design.

Dam failure during construction
At this point, the danger of the core pool overtopping or bursting the shell became greater because the beaches became narrower. For this reason, an extensive alarm system was implemented along the narrower upstream shell. This alarm system could immediately shut off the dredge pumps if a shell breach was detected. Part of this alarm system involved monitoring the elevations of the core pool and the pipelines carrying the dredged fill.

On the morning of September 22, 1938, an inspection by the engineer in charge of construction revealed that the elevation of the pipeline relative to the core pool near station 15+10 (see attached overhead photo) was only  when it should have been . A survey crew was dispatched immediately to determine if the fill on which the pipeline was founded was settling or if the pipeline footing itself was settling. Preliminary measurement showed that the pipeline was closer to the pool than expected from station 15+00 to station 17+00. A meeting with the district engineer and supervisory personnel was scheduled for 1:15 p.m. near the location in question.

At approximately 1:15 p.m. the core pool near station 15+00 began to settle slowly. As the settlement of the pool got larger, portions of the shell began to slide backwards into the core pool area and the majority of the upstream shell began to move into the reservoir, translating south and rotating slightly about the east abutment. The west end of the slide mass broke away from the dam near station 27+00 and the core pool water rapidly poured out of the breach that was created in the shell. Portions of the core in the still-stable portion of the dam continued to slump into the hole created by the loss of the slide mass. One construction supervisor was backing his car away from the advancing scarp to the west along the beach to avoid the slumping and noted that the small scarp in the core was advancing to the west at a speed equal to his own (approximately 10 mph (16 km/h)).

A pump barge moored near the dam at the east abutment was swamped by the slide and was lost along with several tractors, loadmasters, and draglines on the slope. Of the 134 men working in the area at the time, 34 were carried into the sliding material. Of these 34, eight were unable to be rescued and lost their lives. Of the eight men, only two bodies were ever recovered, leaving six men permanently entombed in the structure.

In the testing and analysis done by the Corps of Engineers and others to determine the cause of the slide, several modes of failure were considered. These were: movement along a weak zone in the shale in the abutment, movement along the shale surface, bursting of the shell due to excessive core pressure, and temporary liquefaction of the shell or foundation sand. Extensive laboratory testing of the shale, both weathered and unweathered indicated strengths leading to a factor of safety greater than one. Also, portions of the weathered shale were found in the slide mass, indicating that the slip surface was located somewhere in the shale, but probably at a shallow depth. The core material turned out to be much stronger than expected (having a friction angle of approximately 29 degrees) and was carried out into the slide nearly in a solid mass, making it unlikely that the core was the weak point in the slide. Laboratory testing was done on the shell material and the foundation sand and it was determined that both materials were denser than the critical state for liquefaction. There was no evidence of ground vibration, seismic or otherwise. Some liquefaction may have occurred after the sliding was initiated, but it was unlikely that it caused the slide.

The major weak point in the dam seemed to be the bentonite seams in the Bear Paw shale. Very high water pressures were reported at some points in the shale during the construction. This was likely caused by consolidation due to the overburden of the fill being placed for the dam. The excess pore pressures could not be relieved due to the low permeability of the surrounding shale. This resulted in a low effective stress in the bentonite and a very low shear strength.

2011 flooding and repairs 
According to the Billings Gazette, the dam was damaged by "record-high runoff and flooding in 2011." As of March 2013, "more than $42.9 million in repairs to Fort Peck Dam have been approved by the U.S. Army Corps of Engineers."

Representations in art and literature

Fort Peck Dam is probably best known for being the subject of a photograph of the spillway taken by Margaret Bourke-White while still under construction that was the cover photo of the first issue of Life magazine on November 23, 1936. Later, the photograph by Bourke-White was used on a United States postage stamp in the "Celebrate the Century" series.

The dam is also center-stage in Bucking the Sun, by the Montana-born writer Ivan Doig, published in 1996. The novel tells the story of the fictional Duff family and their various roles in the mammoth dam project, and in the process describes the working conditions and way of life of the thousands of workers hired to construct the Fort Peck Dam, many of them homesteaders from upriver farms destined to disappear under the waters of the newly formed Fort Peck Lake.

Fifty Cents an Hour: The Builders and Boomtowns of the Fort Peck Dam, by Montana author Lois Lonnquist, published in 2006, is an overall history of the Fort Peck dam and spillway construction. Built by the Army Corps of Engineers, PWA Project #30 provided thousands of jobs during the Great Depression. The book includes the history of the boomtowns that sprang up in the area, and the "project people" who lived and worked at Fort Peck during the "dam days."

M.R. Montgomery, Personal History, "Impalpable Dust," The New Yorker, March 27, 1989, p. 94 was written by the son of an engineer who worked at the dam during its construction.  After his father's death, the author researched the dam's construction and his father's role in it.

Notes and references

Further reading
Doig, Ivan (1996) Bucking the Sun, New York: Simon & Schuster, Inc. 
Lonnquist, Lois (2006) Fifty Cents an Hour: The Builders and Boomtowns of the Fort Peck Dam, MtSky Press 
Middlebrooks, T. A. (1942),  "Fort Peck Slide,"  Transactions of the American Society of Civil Engineers, 107, 723-764
"Report on the Slide of a Portion of the Upstream Face of the Fort Peck Dam" (1939), Corps of Engineers, US Army.

External links

 U.S. Army Corps of Engineers - Fort Peck Project
 Snake Butte: Quarry for Rock Used to Make Ft. Peck Dam
 Fort Peck Dam, unofficial website
 Life Magazine construction photos
 Fort Peck Dam Documentary produced by PBS

Dams on the Missouri River
Historic Civil Engineering Landmarks
Fort Peck, Montana
United States Army Corps of Engineers dams
Dams completed in 1940
Dams on the National Register of Historic Places in Montana
Earth-filled dams
National Register of Historic Places in McCone County, Montana
Hydroelectric power plants in Montana
Public Works Administration in Montana
1940 establishments in Montana